Des Moines Township may refer to:

Iowa 
 Des Moines Township, Boone County, Iowa
 Des Moines Township, Dallas County, Iowa
 Des Moines Township, Jasper County, Iowa
 Des Moines Township, Jefferson County, Iowa
 Des Moines Township, Lee County, Iowa
 Des Moines Township, Pocahontas County, Iowa
 Des Moines Township, Polk County, Iowa
 Des Moines Township, Van Buren County, Iowa

Minnesota 
 Des Moines Township, Minnesota

Missouri 
 Des Moines Township, Clark County, Missouri

Township name disambiguation pages